Bryophilinae is a subfamily of moths in the family Noctuidae. The subfamily was erected by Achille Guenée in 1852.

Genera

References

 
Noctuidae